Huncoat railway station is a railway station which serves the village of Huncoat, between Accrington and Burnley in Lancashire, England.

The village's first station was opened in September 1848 by the East Lancashire Railway slightly to the east, but it was relocated to its present site by the Lancashire and Yorkshire Railway in 1902. or 1880s  A nearby colliery and power station were both served by the station and railway for many years, but the pit closed in 1968 and the power plant in 1984. The site is now a nature trail.

The distinctive tall signal box, that once supervised the colliery sidings, avoided closure when the line was re-signalled in 1973, being retained to supervised the level crossing at the west end of the station. It was finally closed in November 2014, and subsequently demolished when the crossing was automated.

The station is unstaffed, with  ticket vending facilities,   There are shelters on each platform and step-free access to each one; along with passenger information screens and a long line PA system to provide running details to passengers.

Services
Monday to Saturday, there is an hourly service from Huncoat to Burnley and Colne (eastbound) and Preston via Accrington and Blackburn (westbound).

Between 14 May 2012 and 10 July 2013, Huncoat was a request stop.

References

External links

Railway stations in Hyndburn
DfT Category F2 stations
Former Lancashire and Yorkshire Railway stations
Northern franchise railway stations
Railway stations in Great Britain opened in 1848